Thomas Sergeant (January 14, 1782 – May 8, 1860) was a Pennsylvania lawyer, judge, and politician.  He served as Secretary of State, Attorney General, and as an associate justice of the state Supreme Court.

Biography and career

Sergeant and his twin Henry were born the sons of Jonathan Dickinson Sergeant and Margaret Spencer.  He graduated from the College of New Jersey in 1798.  He then read law under Jared Ingersoll, and was admitted to the Philadelphia bar in 1802.

In 1812, he married Sarah Bache, a daughter of Sarah Franklin Bache, who was a daughter of Benjamin Franklin.  Their children were Henry Jonathan, Emma, Frances, Thomas Jr., and William, who died in infancy. His grandson, by Frances, was the scholar and linguist, Thomas Sergeant Perry.

From 1812–1814, Sergeant served in the state legislature.  From 1814–1817 he was an associate judge of the District Court of Philadelphia.  From 1817–1819 he was Secretary of the Commonwealth, from 1819–1820 he was state Attorney General.

From 1828–1832 he was postmaster of Philadelphia. In 1831, Sergeant was elected as a member to the American Philosophical Society. From 1834–1846 he served as an associate justice of the state Supreme Court.  Upon resigning, he resumed private practice.  He was president of the Law Academy and a trustee of the University of Pennsylvania.

Sergeant wrote several books on Pennsylvania law.

References

External links
Sergeant family tree
 

1782 births
1860 deaths
Pennsylvania Attorneys General
Secretaries of the Commonwealth of Pennsylvania
Princeton University alumni
Members of the Pennsylvania House of Representatives
Lawyers from Philadelphia
Justices of the Supreme Court of Pennsylvania
19th-century American politicians
19th-century American judges
19th-century American lawyers